Baodera is a monotypic moth genus in the family Lasiocampidae. The genus was erected by Vadim V. Zolotuhin in 1992. Its only species, Baodera khaisana, was described by Frederic Moore in 1879. It is found in India.

References
Zolotuhin, Vadim, V., 1992. Baodera, new genus for Trichiura khasiana Moore, 1879 Lepidoptera, Lasiocampidae. Atalanta (Marktleuthen) 23(3-4): 491-493

Lasiocampidae
Moths of Asia